The following is a list of transfers for the 2010 Major League Soccer season.  Yura Movsisyan's move to Randers FC, Chris Rolfe's move to AaB Fodbold, Cuauhtémoc Blanco's move to Veracruz and David Beckham's loan move to Milan were made during the 2009 season, but those four transfers did not take effect until January 1, 2010.  The rest of the transfers were made during the 2009–10 off-season all the way throughout the 2010 MLS season.

Transfers

References

External links 
 Official Site of Major League Soccer

Major League Soccer
Major League Soccer
2010